Seventeen Years may refer to:

 Seventeen Years (film), a 1999 Chinese film
 Seventeen Years (song), a song by Ratatat